Miramichi is the name of several places in Canada and the US.

Miramichi may also refer to:

Vessels
 Miramichi, the first ship constructed by William Davidson (lumberman)
 , the name of three commissioned Canadian naval units

Other uses
 Miramichi, the form of English spoken in the Miramichi Valley
 Miramichi Bridge, a bridge crossing the Miramichi River at Newcastle, New Brunswick, Canada
 1825 Miramichi Fire, a forest fire in New Brunswick in October 1825
 Miramichi Herald, one of the officers of arms at the Canadian Heraldic Authority

See also